The slender goby (Gobius geniporus) is a species of goby endemic to the Mediterranean Sea where it can be found in inshore waters to a depth of about .  It lives in areas with sandy or muddy substrates near beds of sea-grass.  This species can reach a length of  TL.

References

External links
 

slender goby
Fish of the Mediterranean Sea
slender goby